Mashes Sands is a beach front in Wakulla County, Florida, United States.

Mashes Sands is located 6 miles south-southeast of Panacea at the terminus of Mashes Sands Road (County Road 372). The beach overlooks the Gulf of Mexico from a small peninsula bordered by Ochlockonee Bay on the west and the greater Apalachee Bay to the east.

Mashes Sands saw action during the Civil War. On 15 July 1863, the screw steamer gunboat  and wooden side-wheel steam ferryboat  attacked the salt works here.

"The Sands" is serviced and accessed by Wakulla County Airport, located approximately 3 miles south of Panacea. It is the only airport in Wakulla County.

In June 2007, Mashes Sands was used as a filming location of the student film Apotheosis.

References

External links

Mashes Sands, Florida Google locator
Wakulla County map

Beaches of Wakulla County, Florida
Tallahassee metropolitan area
Beaches of Florida